Survivor Česko & Slovensko 2022 is the first season of a joint Czech-Slovak version of the reality television game show Survivor. This season premiered on January 17, 2022. The cash prize was 2.5 million Czech koruna.

Contestants

Voting history

References

External links

Czech reality television series
Slovak reality television series
Survivor (franchise) seasons